Lizette Risgaard (born 15 July 1960) is a Danish trade union leader.

Born in Nørrebro, Risgaard grew up in a small house and found work as a cleaner.  She moved to Amager, where she trained as an office assistant, while working part-time in a canteen.  In 1980, she began working for the Danish Service Workers' Union, and was elected to the board of its youth organisation.  She worked her way up to become president of the union, and also deputy president of the Capital Region branch of the Danish Confederation of Trade Unions (LO) in 2000.  In her spare time, she completed a Masters in Public Administration.

In 2007, Risgaard was elected as vice president of the LO.  In this role, she became known for her successful campaign for Ryanair to comply with Danish pay and working conditions for its staff based in the country.  In 2015, she was elected as the president of LO, defeating Flemming Vinther of the Army Privates' and Corporals' Association, by 312 votes to 87.  She was the first woman to lead the federation.

As leader of the LO, Risgaard dismissed its four leading staff members, and instead made her own appointments to the post.  She built a strong working relationship with the leaders of the Confederation of Professionals in Denmark, LO's main rival, and in 2019, the two merged to form the Danish Trade Union Confederation (FH), with Risgaard continuing as president.

A documentary, Hjerter dame, follows Risgaard as leader of the LO.

References

1960 births
Living people
Danish trade union leaders
People from Copenhagen